Ahmed Adel may refer to:

 Ahmed Adel Abdel Moneam (born 1987), Egyptian football goalkeeper
 Ahmed Adel (footballer, born 1984), Egyptian football right back